Mohana a town in Odisha.

Mohana may also refer to:

 Mohana Assembly constituency, in Odisha, India
 Mohana Bhogaraju, an Indian playback singer
 Mohanakalyani, a rāgam in Carnatic music
 Mohana (tribe), in Sindh
 Mohana River, in Jharkhand India
 Mohana Silai, a Tamil language historical novel

See also
 Mohan (disambiguation)
 Mahan (disambiguation)